Pan and scan is a method of adjusting widescreen film images so that they can be shown in fullscreen proportions of a standard-definition 4:3 aspect ratio television screen, often cropping off the sides of the original widescreen image to focus on the composition's most important aspects.

Some film directors and enthusiasts disapprove of pan and scan cropping, because it can remove up to 43% of the original image on 2.35:1 films or up to 48% on earlier 2.55:1 presentations, changing the director or cinematographer's original vision and intentions. The most extreme examples remove up to 52% of the original picture on 2.76:1 presentations.

The vertical equivalent is known as "tilt and scan" or "reverse pan and scan". The method was most common in the days of VHS, before widescreen home media such as Laserdisc, DVD and Blu-ray.

Background
For the first several decades of television broadcasting, sets displayed images with a 4:3 aspect ratio, in which the width is 1.33 times the height—similar to most theatrical films prior to 1960. That was acceptable for pre-1953 films such as The Wizard of Oz or Casablanca. However, in the early to mid-1950s, to compete with television and lure audiences away from their sets, producers of theatrical motion pictures began to use "widescreen" formats such as CinemaScope and Todd-AO, which provide more panoramic vistas and present other compositional opportunities. When televised, the image on films with widescreen formats might be twice as wide as the TV screen. Showing a widescreen movie on a television set with a 4:3 screen requires one of two techniques to accommodate the difference: "letterboxing", which preserves the original theatrical aspect ratio, but is not as tall as a standard television screen, leaving black bars at the top and bottom of the screen, or "pan and scan", in which the image fills the full height of the screen, but is cropped horizontally on each side. Pan and scan cuts out as much as half of the image.

In the 1990s (before Blu-ray Disc or HDTV), so-called "Sixteen-By-Nine" or "Widescreen" televisions offered a wider 16:9 aspect ratio (1.78 times the height instead of 1.33) and allowed films with aspect ratios of 1.66:1 and 1.85:1 to fill most or all of the screen, with minimal letterboxing or cropping required. DVD packaging began to use the expression, "16:9 – Enhanced for Widescreen TVs."

Films shot with aspect ratios of 2.20:1, 2.35:1, 2.39:1, 2.55:1, and especially 2.76:1 (Ben-Hur for example), might still be problematic when displayed on televisions of any type. However, when the DVD is "anamorphically enhanced for widescreen", or the film is telecast on a high-definition channel and viewed on a widescreen TV, the black spaces are smaller, and the effect is much like watching a film on a theatrical wide screen. , though aspect ratios of 16:9 (and occasionally 16:10, mostly for computers and tablets) remain standard, wider-screen consumer TVs in 21:9 have been marketed by a number of manufacturers.

Techniques

During the "pan and scan" process, an editor selects the parts of the original filmed composition that seem to be the focus of the shot and makes sure that these are copied (i.e. "scanned"). When the important action shifts to a new position in the frame, the operator moves the scanner to follow it, creating the effect of a "pan" shot.  In a scene in which the focus does not gradually shift from one horizontal position to another—such as actors at each extreme engaging in rapid conversation with each other—the editor may choose to "cut" from one to the other rather than rapidly panning back and forth. If the actors are closer together on the screen, the editor may pan slightly, alternately cropping one or the other partially. This method allows the maximum resolution of the image, since it uses all the available vertical video scan lines—which is especially important for NTSC televisions, having a rather low number of lines available. It also gives a full-screen image on a traditional television set; hence pan-and-scan versions of films on videotape or DVD are often known as fullscreen.

However, it also has several drawbacks.  Some visual information is necessarily cropped out. It can also change a shot in which the camera was originally stationary to one in which it is frequently panning, or change a single continuous shot into one with frequent cuts. In a shot which was originally panned to show something new, or one in which something enters the shot from off-camera, it changes the timing of these appearances to the audience. As an example, in the film Oliver!, made in Panavision, the criminal Bill Sikes commits a murder. The murder takes place mostly offscreen, behind a staircase wall, and Oliver is a witness to it. As Sikes steps back from behind the wall, we see Oliver from the back watching him in terror. In the pan-and-scan version of the film, we see Oliver's reaction as the murder is being committed, but not when Sikes steps backward from the wall having done it. Often in a pan and scan telecast, a character will seem to be speaking offscreen, when what has really happened is that the pan and scan technique has cut their image out of the screen.

Shoot and protect
As television screenings of feature films became more common and more financially important, cinematographers began to work for compositions that would keep the vital information within the "TV safe area" of the frame. For example, the BBC suggested programme makers who were recording in 16:9 frame their shots in a 14:9 aspect ratio which was then broadcast on analogue services with small black bars at the top and bottom of the picture, while owners of widescreen TV sets receiving digital broadcasts would see the full 16:9 picture (this is known as Shoot and protect).

Reframing
One modern alternative to pan and scan is to directly adjust the source material. This is very rare: the only known uses are computer-generated features, such as those produced by Pixar and video games such as BioShock. They call their approach to full-screen versions reframing: some shots are pan and scan, while others (such as notably Warner Bros.' The Lego Movie) are transferred open matte (a full widescreen image extended with added image above and below; though for The Lego Movie, the transferred open matte used a widescreen image cropped to 16:9 with added image above and below to create a 1.37:1-framed Academy ratio image; this version was created for theaters that do not have the anamorphic lens projection equipment). Another method is to keep the camera angle as tight as a pan shot, but move the location of characters, objects, or the camera, so that the subjects fit in the frame. The advent of DVDs and their use of anamorphic presentation, coupled with the increasing popularity of widescreen televisions and computer monitors, have rendered pan and scan less important. Fullscreen versions of films originally produced in widescreen are still available in the United States.

Open matte
Film makers may also create an original image that includes visual information that extends above and below the widescreen theatrical image; this is called "open matte". This may still be pan-and-scanned, but gives the compositor the freedom to "zoom out" or "uncrop" the image to include not only the full width of the wide-format image, but additional visual content at the top and/or bottom of the screen, not included in the widescreen version. As a general rule (prior to the adoption of DVD), special effects would be done within the theatrical aspect ratio, but not the full-frame thereof; also the expanded image area can sometimes include extraneous objects—such as cables, microphone booms, jet vapor trails, or overhead telephone wires—not intended to be included in the frame, depending upon the nature of the shot and how well the full frame was protected.

A more unusual use of the technique is present in the 17 original Dragon Ball Z movies, released from 1986 to 1996. The films were displayed in 1.85:1 during their theatrical release, but this was in fact cut down from 1.37:1 animation- a choice made so that the VHS releases would be nearly uncropped.

Adjusting cinematography to account for aspect ratios
Changes in screen angle (panning) may be necessary to prevent closeups between two speakers where only one person is visible in the pan-and-scan version and both participants seem to speak alternately to persons off camera; this comes at the cost of losing the smoothness of scenes. Inversely, the cropping of a film originally shown in the standard ratio to fit widescreen televisions may cut off foreground or background, such as a tap-dance scene in which much attention is directed appropriately at a dancer's feet. This situation will commonly occur whenever a widescreen TV is set to display full images without stretching (often called the zoom setting) on images with an aspect ratio of 1.78:1 or less. The solution is to pillar box the image by adding black bars on either side of the image, which maintains the full picture height. In Europe, where the PAL TV format offers more resolution to begin with, "pan-and-scan" broadcasts and "pan-and-scan" DVDs of movies originally shown in widescreen are relatively rare, unless it is of programming broadcasts aimed for family viewing times like A Bug's Life. However, on some channels in some countries (such as the United Kingdom), films with an aspect ratio of more than 1.85:1 are panned and scanned to fit the broadcast 1.78:1 ratio.

Reactions
Some directors still balk at the use of "pan and scan" because they feel it compromises the directorial vision with which their movies were created. For instance, Sydney Pollack decided to shoot his 1985 film Out of Africa in a matted 1.85:1 aspect ratio because he was tired of having his movies, which had generally been shot in his preferred format of Anamorphic 2.39:1, "butchered" for television and home video. Furthermore, he brought a lawsuit against Danish TV after a screening of his 1975 film Three Days of the Condor in pan-and-scan in 1991. (The court ruled that the pan scanning conducted by Danish television was a 'mutilation' of the film and a violation of Pollack's droit moral, his legal right as an artist to maintain his reputation by protecting the integrity of his work. Nonetheless, the court ruled in favor of the defendant on a technicality.) Another example is that Phil Lord and Christopher Miller made two versions of The Lego Movie, one in 2.39:1 anamorphic format and another in 1.37:1 open-matte spherical format because some theaters did not employ anamorphic lenses, and also because they were tired of having their movies, which had been shot in their generally preferred aspect ratio of 2.39:1 (except for Extreme Movie which was released in 1.85:1) panned-and-scanned for TV broadcasts (and, in the case of Cloudy with a Chance of Meatballs, its DVD release). Steven Spielberg initially refused to release a pan-and-scan version of Raiders of the Lost Ark but eventually gave in (although he successfully ordered the letterboxed format for the home video releases of The Color Purple and Always); Woody Allen refused altogether to release one of Manhattan, the letterbox version is therefore the only version available on VHS and DVD even though one VHS release includes the typical pan-and-scan disclaimer on the cover. Even the "pan and scan" versions of the widescreen animated shorts from the 1950s were also criticized, as several details, such as in Tom and Jerry. A scene show the babysitter grabbing the baby out of Tom's hands near the end of Tot Watchers and the ant blowing his horn near the end of Barbecue Brawl, are cropped out, which occasionally airs on TV channels, such as Cartoon Network and Boomerang. In Tom and Jerry's digital HD downloads on Amazon Prime and HBO Max, four widescreen CinemaScope shorts, The Egg and Jerry, Blue Cat Blues, Mucho Mouse and Tot Watchers are cropped to 16:9 from the much wider CinemaScope ratio, causing both sides of the picture to be lost. The rest of the widescreen shorts are available in the original CinemaScope widescreen aspect ratio.

Several prominent film critics, most notably Gene Siskel and Roger Ebert, have also criticized "pan and scan", and agreed with directors that movies should be presented as they were intended.

See also
 Angle of view
 Letterboxing (filming)
 List of film formats
 Motion picture terminology
 Open matte
 Panning
 Widescreen

References

External links
 The Letterbox and Widescreen Advocacy Page
 YouTube video about Pan and Scan

Film production
Television terminology